Hugh Frazer (1795–1865) was an Irish landscape and genre painter.

Frazer was born in Dromore, County Down, enrolled in the Dublin Society in 1812 and exhibited at the Royal Hibernian Academy from 1826 through 1864. Granted membership at the RHA in 1837, he was a professor there from 1839 to 1853.

References

External links

Hugh Frazer Biography

1795 births
1865 deaths
People from County Down
19th-century Irish painters
Irish male painters
19th-century Irish male artists